Hamraia is a town and commune in Reguiba District, El Oued Province, Algeria. According to the 2008 census it has a population of 5,172, up from 3,938 in 1998, with an annual growth rate of 2.8%.

Geography
Hamraia is near Chott Melrhir, a large endorheic salt lake that lies to the north of the town. The lake and its surrounds, including the town of Hamraia, lie below sea level. Another salt lake, Chott Felrhir, lies to the southwest of Hamraia.

Climate

Hamraia has a hot desert climate (Köppen climate classification BWh), with very hot summers and mild winters, and very little precipitation throughout the year.

Transportation
Hamraia is on the N48 which connect El Oued to Still. From Still, the N3 leads south to Touggourt and north to Biskra.

Education

4.3% of the population has a tertiary education, and another 11.8% has completed secondary education. The overall literacy rate is 66.6%, and is 71.9% among males and 61.2% among females.

Localities 
The commune of Hamraia is composed of two localities:

 Hamraïa
 Méguibra

References 

Neighbouring towns and cities

Communes of El Oued Province
El Oued Province